Chortovets is a village, located near Horodenka and Obertyn in Kolomyia Raion, Ivano-Frankivsk Oblast (province) of western Ukraine. It belongs to Horodenka urban hromada, one of the hromadas of Ukraine. 

Until 18 July 2020, Chortovets belonged to Horodenka Raion. The raion was abolished in July 2020 as part of the administrative reform of Ukraine, which reduced the number of raions of Ivano-Frankivsk Oblast to six. The area of Horodenka Raion was merged into Kolomyia Raion.

References

Villages in Kolomyia Raion
Shtetls